Raimondo Crociani (born 14 January 1946) is an Italian film editor and occasional director.

Raised in a family of film editors, he started working between the late 1960s and early 1970s in numerous political documentaries produced by Unitelefilm, a film company linked to the Italian Communist Party.

During his career, Crociani has worked as editor on more than 100 productions between 1971 and 2012, including works by Ettore Scola, Valerio Zurlini, Franco Giraldi, Alberto Bevilacqua, Steno, Alberto Sordi, and Roberto Faenza.

He won a David di Donatello for Best Editing in 1985, for Ettore Scola's Ballando Ballando.

Selected filmography
 An Ideal Adventure (1982)

References

External links
 

Living people
Italian film editors
1946 births
David di Donatello winners
Film people from Rome